Oakland Historic District may refer to:

 Oakland Historic District (Phoenix, Arizona), listed on the NRHP in Maricopa County, Arizona
Downtown Oakland Historic District, Oakland, CA, listed on the NRHP in California
Oakland Waterfront Warehouse District, Oakland, CA, listed on the NRHP in California
Meriden Avenue-Oakland Road Historic District, Southington, CT, listed on the NRHP in Connecticut
Oakland City Historic District, Atlanta, GA, listed on the NRHP in Georgia
Oakland District, a historic district in the Oakland community area of Chicago, Illinois
Oakland-Freeport Historic District, Oakland, KY, listed on the NRHP in Kentucky
 Oakland Historic District (Oakland, Maryland), listed on the NRHP in Maryland
Oakland Historic District (Oakland, Oregon), listed on the NRHP in Oregon
Oakland Historic District (Burrillville, Rhode Island), listed on the NRHP in Rhode Island
Oakland Avenue Historic District, Providence, RI, listed on the NRHP in Rhode Island
Oakland-Dousman Historic District, Green Bay, WI, listed on the NRHP in Wisconsin

See also
Oakland (disambiguation)